Dayley is a surname. Notable people with the surname include:

Ken Dayley (born 1959), American baseball player
K. Newell Dayley (born 1939), American composer, hymnwriter, and musician
Thomas Dayley (born 1944), American politician

See also
Daley
Gayley
Hayley